Havenwoods State Forest is a  property managed by the Wisconsin Department of Natural Resources within the city limits of Milwaukee. The forest was created to provide an urban green space and environmental education center.

The land includes grasslands, woods, wetlands, Lincoln Creek, an urban arboretum, and education gardens. The Environmental Awareness Center includes an auditorium, classrooms, displays, and a resource center. There are trails for nature study, hiking, biking, and cross-country skiing. Schoenecker Park abuts the property on the northeast.

Havenwoods is open from 6 a.m. to 8 p.m. daily. A state park vehicle admission sticker is not required to use the park.

References

External links
Havenwoods State Forest official site
Friends of Havenwoods

Wisconsin state forests
Nature centers in Wisconsin
Geography of Milwaukee
Protected areas of Milwaukee County, Wisconsin
Tourist attractions in Milwaukee
Protected areas established in 1979
1979 establishments in Wisconsin
North Side, Milwaukee